A Galilean cannon is a device that demonstrates conservation of linear momentum. It comprises a stack of balls, starting with a large, heavy ball at the base of the stack and progresses up to a small, lightweight ball at the top. The basic idea is that this stack of balls can be dropped to the ground and almost all of the kinetic energy in the lower balls will be transferred to the topmost ball - which will rebound to many times the height from which it was dropped. At first sight, the behavior seems highly counter-intuitive, but in fact is precisely what conservation of momentum predicts. The principal difficulty is in keeping the configuration of the balls stable during the initial drop. Early descriptions involve some sort of glue/tape, tube, or net to align the balls.

A modern version of the Galilean cannon was sold by Edmund Scientific Corporation and is still sold as the "Astro Blaster". In this device, a heavy wire is threaded through all of the balls to keep them accurately aligned - but the principle is the same. The resulting rebound is quite powerful; in fact, eye safety issues became so prevalent that this toy now comes with safety goggles.

It is possible to demonstrate the principle more simply with just two balls, such as a basketball and a tennis ball. If an experimenter balances the tennis ball on top of the basketball and drops the pair to the ground, the tennis ball will rebound to many times the height from which it was released.

Calculation for two balls

Assuming elastic collisions, uniform gravity, no air resistance and the sizes of the balls being negligible compared to the heights from which they are dropped, formulas for conservation of momentum and kinetic energy can be used to calculate the speed and heights of rebound of the small ball:

 .

Solving the simultaneous equations above for v2′,

Taking velocities upwards as positive, as the balls fall from the same height and the large ball rebounds off the floor with the same speed, v1 = −v2 (the negative sign denoting the direction reversed). Thus

 .
Because .
As the rebound height is linearly proportional to the square of the launch speed, the maximum rebound height for a two-ball cannon is 32 = 9 times the original drop height, when m1 >> m2.

See also 
 Newton's cradle

References

Physics experiments
Educational toys